Nina Hagen in Ekstasy is the third solo (and fifth overall) studio album by German singer Nina Hagen. It was released on January 10, 1985, by CBS Records. The German version of the album Nina Hagen in Ekstase was released simultaneously. It was Hagen's last album released on the CBS label, before her recording contract expired in 1986. The album is mainly produced by Adam Kidron and was recorded in Ibiza and Paris. Hagen worked with Karl Rucker and Billy Liesegang and wrote most of the songs on the album. Unlike her previous disco-influenced album Fearless (1983), Nina Hagen in Ekstasy is musically more punk rock with elements of dance music. It contains cover versions of Frank Sinatra's "My Way" and Norman Greenbaum's "Spirit in the Sky".

After its release, Nina Hagen in Ekstasy received mixed reviews from the critics and although it was released during the rise of Hagen's popularity in the United States, the album was not a big commercial success. She appeared as a guest on many television shows, including Late Night with David Letterman and The Merv Griffin Show, where she promoted the record. In January 1985, she performed at one of the largest music festivals in the world, Rock in Rio, where she performed most of the songs from the album.

The lead single "Universal Radio" became a club hit, peaking at number 39 on the Billboard Hot Dance Club Songs.

Background and recording
After the success of her 1983 album Fearless, Hagen went on to record a new album, more punk rock than her previous one. She changed her image, sporting a shocking pink, waist-length mane and black eye makeup, and teamed up with Karl Rucker, with whom she had already worked on her two previous albums, and started working with Billy Liesegang and Peter Krause. The recording process was affected by Adam Kidron's motorbike accident which caused him getting numbness in his arm.

Composition
Hagen has been vocally compared to Wendy O. Williams. The opening and lead song "Universal Radio" was co-written by Hagen and Ron Dumas, who had previously recorded the song in 1983 with his band Ron Dumas Group. She later described the song as not being musically very interesting and that she originally wanted to do her vocals differently, but was directed by the recording company to make the record more "commercial". "Gods of Aquarius" begins with a downtempo intro before becoming a heavy rock song, resembling some of Billy Idol's early records. Lyrically, the song is one of many, where Hagen talks about UFOs, referring to her 1981 experience with spotting something that looked like a cosmic ship in Malibu. It was during the time she was pregnant with her daughter Cosma Shiva. On "Russian Reggae" she puts on fake, over-the-top Russian accent and sings about the dangers of a nuclear war. Her take on Paul Anka's song "My Way" was already recorded and released on her 1980 extended play, but became one of her signature songs, which she performed at many of her shows. In the next song, Hagen talks about living on a fictional street "1985 Ekstasy Drive". The track has heavy guitar riffs and simple lyrics.

In "Prima Nina in Ekstasy", Hagen sings about herself being entitled the "Mother of Punk". When she arrived in London in 1977, she was already 21, while the other people on the punk scene were all about 15 or 16 years old. That was when she first received the title. The song features heavy synths and male background vocals. The cover version of Norman Greenbaum's "Spirit in the Sky" appears on the album in two versions. The first is in English and the second, "Gott In Himmel", is a reprise sung in German. It again refers to her UFO sighting in Malibu. "Atomic Flash Deluxe" is built around a simple bassline and electronic samples. It is the most experimental song on the album. Hagen mentions cocaine, harakiri and Babylon. The last song is a punk version of "The Lord's Prayer", which features an interpolation of Aram Khachaturian's "Sabre Dance".

Promotion

Singles
"Universal Radio" was released as the album's lead single. The song was premiered by Rodney Bingenheimer on the radio station KROQ. It was the only song of the album that got in the charts. It peaked at number 39 on the Billboard Hot Dance Club Songs. The music video for the song featured a footage of her performance at the Rock in Rio festival. "Spirit in the Sky" was released a promotional single. The music video for "1985 Ekstasy Drive" was also released. It was shot in the streets of Los Angeles, California.

Track listing

Personnel
Credits adapted from the album's liner notes.

Nina Hagen – vocals
Billy Liesegang – guitar
Peter Krause – drums
Alex Laroque – drums
Karl Rucker – bass, keyboards, drums
Roger Scott Craig – keyboards
Michael McEvoy – keyboards, horn arrangements
Balis Jiouraitis – grand piano
Alain Guillard – saxophone
Eric Le Lann – trumpet
Afrika Bambaataa & Soulsonic Force, Shango – vocals on "Prima Nina in Ekstasy"
Paul Eknes – background vocals on "Spirits in the Sky"

Design
Juliana Grigorova Knepler – cover art, design
Diana Lyn – photography
Mark Murphy – collages

Production
Adam Kidron – producer, engineer
Richard James Burgess – producer on "My Way"
Alain Français – engineer
Vladimir Meller – engineer, mastering
Trevor Hallesy – engineer

Charts

References

External links
[ Nina Hagen in Ekstasy] at AllMusic

1985 albums
Nina Hagen albums
Albums produced by Adam Kidron
CBS Records albums
Columbia Records albums